Lin Hsiung-cheng (5 November 1888 - 27 November 1946), born in Pangkio, Tamsui District, Taipeh Prefecture, Fujian-Taiwan Province, Qing Taiwan (modern-day Banqiao District, New Taipei, Taiwan), was a Taiwanese banker and philanthropist. He was a member of the Lin Ben Yuan Family, the richest family of Taiwan in the late Qing dynasty and Japanese-ruled Era. He was the richest person of Taiwan in his time. He joined the Tongmenghui in 1904, and supported the Sun Yat-sen's revolutions as a patronage. Lin was a co-founder of the Hua Nan Bank. He also participated in other businesses such as sugar production, railroad building, or coal mining. His father was Lin Erh-kang (林爾康). His only son is Lin Ming-cheng (林明成), the current vice chairman of Hua Nan Financial Holdings.

References

Taiwanese bankers
Hsiung-cheng
1888 births
1946 deaths
Businesspeople from New Taipei
Taiwanese people of Hoklo descent